Fiona MacCarthy  (23 January 1940 – 29 February 2020) was a British biographer and cultural historian best known for her studies of 19th- and 20th-century art and design.

Early life and education
Fiona MacCarthy was born in Sutton, Surrey into an upper-class background, from which she spent much of her life escaping. Her father, Gerald MacCarthy, was an officer in the Royal Artillery and was killed in action in North Africa during the Second World War in 1943. Fiona MacCarthy, her sister and mother, Yolande, lived in London and then Scotland before returning to London. Her grandmother, the Baroness de Belabre, was a daughter of Sir Robert McAlpine, 1st Baronet, who built and owned the Dorchester Hotel, and much of her childhood was spent in the hotel. Supposedly safe from bombing raids, her family took refuge there during The Blitz.

MacCarthy was educated at Wycombe Abbey School. In 1958, after a spell in Paris, she was a debutante being presented to the Queen at Queen Charlotte's Ball in the final year of the 200-year-old ritual, an experience MacCarthy recounted in her memoir, Last Curtsey: the End of the Debutantes (2007). She was one of only four of that year's debutantes to go on to university, in her case studying for a degree in English literature at Lady Margaret Hall, Oxford.

Career
After graduation, MacCarthy's first job was as a merchandise editor and then journalist on House & Garden magazine. MacCarthy joined The Guardian in 1963 initially as an assistant to the women's editor Mary Stott. She was then appointed the newspaper's design correspondent, working as a features writer and columnist, sometimes using a pseudonymous byline to avoid two articles appearing in the same issue. In this role, she interviewed David Hockney, Betty Friedan and John Lennon among others. She left The Guardian in 1969, briefly becoming women's editor of the London Evening Standard, before settling in Sheffield.

In Sheffield, MacCarthy became a biographer and critic. After writing a biography of the arts and crafts designer C. R. Ashbee, she came to wider attention as a biographer with a once-controversial study of the Roman Catholic craftsman and sculptor Eric Gill, first published in 1989. Subsequent biographies of Stanley Spencer in 1997 and of Byron in 2002 enhanced her reputation for undertaking detailed research into her subjects. MacCarthy was also known for her arts essays and reviews, which appeared in The Guardian, The Times Literary Supplement and The New York Review of Books. She contributed to TV and radio arts programmes.

Awards and honours
Fiona MacCarthy was a Fellow of the Royal Society of Literature (1997), an Honorary Fellow of Lady Margaret Hall, Oxford, and a Senior Fellow of the Royal College of Art.

She was appointed an Officer of the Order of the British Empire (OBE) for services to literature in the 2009 Birthday Honours. She was awarded honorary doctorates by the University of Sheffield and Sheffield Hallam University and was awarded the Bicentenary Medal of the Royal Society of Arts.

Her biography William Morris: A Life for our Time (1994) was winner of the Wolfson History Prize and the Writers' Guild Non-fiction Award. The Last Pre-Raphaelite: Edward Burne-Jones and the Victorian Imagination won the 2012 James Tait Black prize for Biography. Her life of Walter Gropius, founder of the Bauhaus, was published in March 2019.

Personal life
Her first marriage to Ian White-Thompson ended in divorce. In 1966, she married the Sheffield-based silversmith and cutlery designer David Mellor. She first met him when she went to interview him for The Guardian in 1964. They had two children, Corin and Clare, both of whom have now become designers. After suffering from dementia for some years, Mellor died in May 2009.

Fiona MacCarthy died on 29 February 2020, aged 80.

Works

1972 All Things Bright and Beautiful: British Design 1830 to Today
1981 The Simple Life: C. R. Ashbee in the Cotswolds
1984 The Omega Workshops: Decorative Arts of Bloomsbury
1989 Eric Gill
1994 William Morris: A Life for our Time
1997 Stanley Spencer: An English Vision
2002 Byron: Life and Legend
2007 Last Curtsey: The End of the Debutantes
2011 The Last Pre-Raphaelite: Edward Burne-Jones and the Victorian Imagination
2019  Walter Gropius: Visionary Founder of the Bauhaus 

Exhibitions
She curated the following exhibitions:
Homespun to Highspeed: British Design 1860 to 1960 for Sheffield Museums and Art Galleries, 1979
The Omega Workshops: Decorative Arts of Bloomsbury for the Crafts Council, 1984
Eye for Industry: retrospective of the Royal Designers for the Victoria and Albert Museum, 1986
Byron for the National Portrait Gallery, 2002
Anarchy and Beauty, William Morris and his Legacy for the National Portrait Gallery, 2014

References

External links
Official site at Lady Margaret Hall

1940 births
2020 deaths
British debutantes
Writers from London
People educated at Wycombe Abbey
English biographers
Officers of the Order of the British Empire
Alumni of Lady Margaret Hall, Oxford
Fellows of Lady Margaret Hall, Oxford
Fellows of the Royal Society of Literature
James Tait Black Memorial Prize recipients
People from the London Borough of Sutton
People from Hathersage
The Guardian people